Sundar Lal Tiwari (13 December 1957 – 11 March 2019) was an Indian politician and a member of the Indian National Congress party.

Political career
Sundar Lal Tiwari became a MP in Lok Sabha from Rewa in 1999. He was elected as an MLA of the Madhya Pradesh Legislative Assembly in 2013.

Personal life
Sundar Lal Tiwari was the son of Sriniwas Tiwari, a prominent Congress politician from Madhya Pradesh. He was married to Rashmi Tiwari, and they had a son and a daughter. His son Siddharth Tiwari is also an Indian politician.

See also
Madhya Pradesh Legislative Assembly
2013 Madhya Pradesh Legislative Assembly election

References

External links

2019 deaths
Indian National Congress politicians from Madhya Pradesh
1957 births